Orsino Orsini Migliorati (1473–1500) was the husband of Giulia "La Bella" Farnese (1474–1524), the mistress of Pope Alexander VI.

Family

The only son of Ludovico Orsini Migliorati (1425-1489) and Adriana de Mila (b. 1434), Orsino was related to Alexander VI through his mother, who was the Pope's cousin. Adriana had been widowed at an early age and had sought the "protection" of her cousin, then-Cardinal Rodrigo Borgia, in order to effectively administer her late husband's vast estates and to safeguard her son's considerable inheritance. In return for this "protection", Adriana served as Rodrigo's friend and close confidante and was even put in charge of the wardship of his illegitimate daughter Lucrezia Borgia.

Marriage and adult life

At age 16, Orsino married 15-year-old Giulia Farnese, the daughter of Luigi Farnese by his wife, Giovanna Caetani. Giulia was also the sister of the future Pope Paul III (born Alessandro Farnese). While Orsino has been rather disparagingly described as being "squint eyed," "awkward" and "self-conscious," Giulia was a beautiful young woman who went by the nickname of La Bella, "the beautiful one." Shortly after this marriage, around 1491, Giulia met Rodrigo Borgia, during one of his visits to Monte Giordano to see his daughter, Lucrezia. When the Cardinal expressed a desire to take her daughter-in-law for a mistress, Adriana immediately gave her permission and blessings to the affair. In exchange for his enforced compliance to his wife's adultery with Rodrigo, Orsino was granted mayorship of the city of Carbognano. Rodrigo Borgia took the papal throne in August 1492 as Alexander VI, the same year in which Giulia gave birth to a daughter, Laura, whose paternity is still disputed today, although Giulia claimed she was Borgia's own daughter. Briefly concerned that a scandal would break out, Alexander VI did not acknowledge paternity, which was instead attributed to, and accepted by, Orsino. 

Orsino died in 1500, at age 27, of unknown causes. At around the time of his death, Giulia and the Pope had become mildly estranged but his mother, Adriana, eventually brokered a peaceful separation of the two. Adriana herself continued to remain in high standing with the Pope as his friend and confidante, even chaperoning Lucrezia on her journey to wed Alfonso d'Este. Adriana died in about 1509, and the control of Carbognano passed to her erstwhile daughter-in-law, Giulia. The vast Orsini family fortune was eventually inherited by Laura Orsini and then by her children, Giulio and Lavinia della Rovere.

Ancestry

References
 Bellonci, Maria. The Life and Times of Lucrezia Borgia.
 Williams, George. L. Papal Genealogy: The Families and Descendants of the Popes.

15th-century Italian nobility
Orsini family
1473 births
1500 deaths